The Romania Olympic football team represents Romania in international football competitions in Olympic Games. The selection is limited to players under the age of 23, except for three overage players. The team is controlled by the Romanian Football Federation. Having qualified for four Olympic competitions since 1924, Romania ranked fifth in 1964 (its best result).

Results and fixtures

Legend

2021

Players

Current squad
The following players were called up for the Olympic Games.

Recent call-ups
The following players have been called up for the team within the last 12 months.

Notes
INJ = Player withdrew from the squad due to an injury
RET = Player who retired from national team
WD = Player withdrew from the squad

Competitive record

Olympic Games

See also
Sport in Romania
Football in Romania
Women's football in Romania
Romania men's national football team
Romania men's national under-21 football team
Romania women's national football team
Romania women's national under-19 football team
Romania women's national under-17 football team

References

European national under-23 association football teams
European Olympic national association football teams
 
Foot